Nicolas Bro (born 16 March 1972) is a Danish actor born in Copenhagen, Denmark.

Background 
Bro grew up in a family of actors; his mother is Danish actress Helle Hertz and father is the actor Christoffer Bro.
His brother Anders Peter Bro is an actor and his sister Laura Bro is an actress. His two aunts Vigga Bro and Lone Hertz are actresses too. He graduated from the Danish National School of Theatre and Contemporary Dance in 1998.

Career highlights 
He plays at Copenhagen's The Royal Theatre. In the Offscreen movie directed by Christoffer Boe he acted as an actor and cinematographer at the same time.  He appeared in a supporting role as Justice Minister Thomas Buch in series 2 of the Danish TV drama The Killing and as Council President D. G. Monrad in the Danish TV period drama 1864. He also appeared as Freddie Holst in the 3rd season of Swedish-Danish series The Bridge.

Awards 
In 2005 he was awarded the Natsvaerme Award for young Danish talent at the Copenhagen Natfilm Festival.

He received the Danish theatre award the Reumert prize for his performance in Ole Bornedal's Skrigerne at Copenhagen's Aveny-T theatre. He received the Reumert prize for Best leading actor on stage in both 2007 and 2008.

Filmography

Film 

 Election Night (1998, Short) – man
 The Art of Success (1999, Short) – Eddie
 Kira's Reason: A Love Story (2001) – Tattoo Mogens
 Monas Verden (2001) – film editor
 Kira's Reason: A Love Story (2001) – John
 The Performance (2002)
 Minor Mishaps (2002) – hospital porter
 The Dog's Called Fiat 128 (informal English title),  (USA title) (2003) – Sales Clerk
 The Green Butchers (2003) – Hus Hans
 Stealing Rembrandt (2003) – Jimmy
 Reconstruction (2003) – Leo Sand
 The Fighter (2003)
  (2003) – Spritter
 Rule No. 1 (2003) – Palle
  (2004) – Mulle
 King's Game (2004) – Henrik Moll
 We Are the Champions (2005) – Asger
 Adam's Apples (2005) – Gunnar
 Dark Horse (2005) – Morfar
 Murk (2005) – Anker
 Allegro (2005) – Terence Sander
 Uro (2006) – Dansken
 Skymaster: A Flying Family Fairytale (2006) – Alf
 Restless (2006)
 Offscreen (2006) – himself
 The Black Madonna (2007) – Brian
  (2007) – Weinberger
  (2007) – Bertel Nymann
 Soi Cowboy (2008) – Tobias Christiansen
 The Good Heart (2009) – Ib Dolby
 At World's End (2009) – Mikael Feldt
 Brotherhood (2009) – Tykke
 Over gaden under vandet (2009) – Ask
 Everything will be Fine (2010) – Håkon
 Smukke mennesker (2010) – doctor
 Sandheden om mænd (2010) – Ulle
  (2011) – Bjarne Jensen (voice)
 Beast (2011) – Bruno
 War Horse (2011) – Friedrich
  (2012) – Allan
  (2012) – Morten
  (2012) – Aslan
  (2013) – Mogens Glistrup
  (2013) – Dr. Albert Gæmmelkra / The Flea
 Sorrow and Joy (2013) – Birkemose
 Nymphomaniac (2013) – F
  (2014) – Dr. Albert Gæmmelkra / The Flea
 Men & Chicken (2015) – Josef
  (2015) – Holger
  (2015) – Dr. Albert Gæmmelkra / The Flea
  (2016) – Kaj
  (2017) – Ib
 Ljusningen (2017) – Nibler
  (2017) – Sønnen Vincent
  (2017) – Oskar
 Fantasten (2017) – Hasse
  (2017) – Peter Ilsøe
  (2018) – Brandt
  (2019) – Sarkan
 Domino (2019) – Hospital Porter
  (2019) – Viggo Mortensen
 Collision (2019 film) (2019) – Wagner
 The Middle Man (2019) – The Pastor
 Riders of Justice (2020) – Emmenthaler
 A Taste of Hunger (2021) – Torben

TV 
 The Killing (2009) – Thomas Buch
 Mammon (2014) – Arkitekten
 1864 (2014) – Ditlev Gothardt Monrad
 The Bridge (2015) – Freddie
 Troldspejlet & Co (2019)
 DNA (2019) – Jarl Skaubo
 The Kingdom (2022) - Balder

References

External links 
 

1972 births
Danish male actors
Best Supporting Actor Bodil Award winners
Male actors from Copenhagen
Living people
Best Actor Bodil Award winners